

Men's events

Team events

1963
1963 Pan American Games
Pan American Games
Shooting competitions in Brazil